The 2020–21 King Cup, or The Custodian of the Two Holy Mosques Cup, was the 46th edition of the King Cup since its establishment in 1957. The tournament commenced on 16 December 2020 and concluded with the final on 27 May 2021. 

The number of teams was reduced from 64 to 16 as a result of the COVID-19 pandemic in Saudi Arabia. The competition was limited to the 16 teams participating in the 2020–21 Saudi Professional League.

Al-Hilal are the defending champions after defeating Al-Nassr 2–1 in the final. Al-Hilal were eliminated by Al-Fateh in the round of 16.

Al-Faisaly won their first title after a 3–2 win over Al-Taawoun in the final on 27 May 2021. As winners of the competition, Al-Faisaly qualified for the 2022 AFC Champions League group stage.

Effects of the COVID-19 pandemic
On 9 October 2020, the SAFF decided to extend the use of five substitutions in matches (with a sixth allowed in extra time) to the 2020–21 season, which was implemented at the end of the previous season to lessen the impact of fixture congestion caused by the COVID-19 pandemic. The use of five substitutes, based on the decision of competition organizers, had been extended by IFAB until 2021. The prize fund remained the same with the winners receiving 10 million SAR.

Participating teams
A total of 16 teams participated in this season. All of which compete in the Pro League.

Bracket

Notes
 H: Home team
 A: Away team

Source: SAFF

Round of 16
The draw for the whole tournament was held on 2 November 2020. The dates for the Round of 16 fixtures were announced on 18 November 2020. All times are local, AST (UTC+3).

Quarter-finals
The dates for the Quarter-finals fixtures were announced on 13 January 2021. All times are local, AST (UTC+3).

Semi-finals
The dates for the Semi-final fixtures were announced on 16 March 2021. All times are local, AST (UTC+3).

Final

All times are local, AST (UTC+3).

Top goalscorers
As of 27 May 2021

Note: Players and teams marked in bold are still active in the competition.

References

External links
Custodian of the Two Holy Mosques Cup – Saudi Arabia 2021, Goalzz.com
King's Cup, saff.com.sa

2020–21
2020–21 in Saudi Arabian football
Saudi Arabia
King Cup, 2020-21